Gallery car may refer to:
 Gallery Car
 Gallery cars
 Pullman Gallery Car